Maurice Petty (March 27, 1939July 25, 2020) was an American NASCAR crew chief and engine builder for Petty Enterprises, of which he was part owner.  He was inducted into the International Motorsports Hall of Fame in 2011.  He was subsequently enshrined into the NASCAR Hall of Fame in 2014.  He was the first engine builder to be inducted into that Hall.

Early life
Petty was born in Level Cross, North Carolina, on March 27, 1939.  As a child, he would follow his father, Lee Petty, to the race track.  The younger Petty's mechanical skills were credited as having played an "integral part" in his father's success.  Although he himself started 26 times in the NASCAR Cup Series between 1960 and 1964, he soon elected to focus on engine building.

Career
Petty Enterprises was founded by Lee Petty and his two sons. The Petty family, working together as a team, corporately won over 250 races. Maurice primarily served the organization as engine builder and crew chief. He raced for the organization in 26 competitions from 1960 to 1964. As a driver, his best finish was third place at the Piedmont Interstate Fairgrounds in Spartanburg, South Carolina in 1961. In 1970, Petty was the crew chief for Pete Hamilton, who won three races for Petty Enterprises, including the 1970 Daytona 500 and both races at Talladega Superspeedway. As an engine builder, Maurice built the motors that helped his brother Richard win a record 200 victories, along with seven Cup Series championships.

In 2011, Maurice Petty was inducted into the International Motorsports Hall of Fame in Talladega, Alabama, in recognition of his career as a team owner, engine builder, crew chief, and driver.  Three years later, he was enshrined into the NASCAR Hall of Fame.  He became the first engine builder to be inducted into that Hall, as well as the fourth member from Petty Enterprises.

Personal life and Death
Petty was the younger brother of Richard Petty, who depended on his engines throughout the latter's career.  He was also the uncle of Kyle Petty and Trent Owens, and the great uncle of Adam Petty.  Maurice was married to Patricia for 52 years, until her death in 2014. Petty suffered from polio as a child, and ongoing effects of the illness resulted in him becoming less mobile, which played a role in his retirement from the Petty Enterprises team.

Petty died on the morning of July 25, 2020, at age 81.  The cause of death was undisclosed.

Honors and awards 
 2011: International Motorsports Hall of Fame inductee
 2013: NASCAR Hall of Fame nominee
 2014: NASCAR Hall of Fame Class of 2014

Motorsports career results
Source:

NASCAR
(key) (Bold – Pole position awarded by qualifying time. Italics – Pole position earned by points standings or practice time. * – Most laps led.)

Grand National Series

References

External links
 
 
 "2 Minutes With.." Interview Video

1939 births
2020 deaths
Petty family
Kyle Petty
Richard Petty
NASCAR crew chiefs
People from Randolph County, North Carolina
Racing drivers from North Carolina
NASCAR drivers
NASCAR Hall of Fame inductees
International Motorsports Hall of Fame inductees